Orybina is a genus of moths of the family Pyralidae. It was described by Snellen in 1895.

Species
 Orybina flaviplaga Walker, 1863
 Orybina plangonalis (Walker, 1859)

References

Pyralinae
Pyralidae genera